Kingsknowe railway station is a railway station serving Kingsknowe in the Scottish city of Edinburgh. The station has two platforms, connected by a level crossing, and CCTV. It is managed by ScotRail.

History 
Kingsknowe station was opened by the Caledonian Railway on 15 February 1848. It was closed to passenger services by British Railways on 6 July 1964 and reopened on 1 February 1971.

Services 

It is currently served, Mondays to Saturdays, by one ScotRail service each hour from Glasgow Central to Edinburgh Waverley.

References

Sources

External links 

Video footage of the station

Railway stations in Edinburgh
Railway stations served by ScotRail
Railway stations in Great Britain opened in 1848
Railway stations in Great Britain closed in 1917
Railway stations in Great Britain opened in 1919
Railway stations in Great Britain closed in 1964
Railway stations in Great Britain opened in 1971
Reopened railway stations in Great Britain
Beeching closures in Scotland
Former Caledonian Railway stations